Brenda Andrea Santoyo Pérez (born August 17, 1996) is a Mexican road bicycle racer, who last rode for UCI Women's Team .

Major results

2013
3rd Overall Volta do México Copa Governador

2014
3rd Aguascalientes – Copa Ciclista PRI
4th San Louis – Copa Ciclista PRI

2016
1st Martigny–Mauvoisin
3rd Kriterium Riehen
4th Grand Prix Olten
4th Ceignes
7th Road race, National Road Championships
8th Thun-West (ITT)

2017
1st Prix du Saugeais
3rd L'Enfer du Chablais
4th Berner Rundfahrt
6th Grand Prix Crevoisier–Tour de la Courtine
9th Critérium de Montreux

2018
National Road Championships
1st  Road race
2nd Time trial
1st Overall La Vuelta Yucatan–MZ Tour
1st Stages 1, 2 & 3 (ITT)
2nd Overall Tucson Bicycle Classic
3rd Gran Premio Comite Olimpico Nacional Femenino
4th Overall Vuelta Internacional Femenina a Costa Rica
1st  Mountains classification 
1st Stage 1
5th Overall Vuelta a Colombia Femenina
1st Stage 1 
7th Overall Vuelta Femenina a Guatemala
1st Stage 1
8th Copa Federacion de Ruta Aguascalientes
9th Gran Premio ICODER

References

External links

1996 births
Living people
Mexican female cyclists
Cyclists at the 2014 Summer Youth Olympics
21st-century Mexican women
20th-century Mexican women